Ceutorhynchus americanus is a species of true weevils in the tribe Ceutorhynchini. It is found in Alaska, United States.

References

External links 

 
 
 Ceutorhynchus americanus at insectoid.info

Ceutorhynchini
Beetles described in 1937